The 30th Royal Bavarian Reserve Division (30. Kgl. Bayerische Reserve-Division) was a reserve infantry division of the Imperial German Army in World War I. It was initially the Main Reserve, Fortress Strasbourg (Hauptreserve/Festung Straßburg) and was designated the 30th Reserve Division (30. Reserve-Division) from mobilization in August 1914. It was almost entirely made up of Bavarian units and thus, on December 26, 1916, it was renamed the 30th Royal Bavarian Reserve Division. It spent the war engaged in positional warfare in the Vosges mountains of France and the Alsace-Lorraine region.

On mobilization, the division comprised three brigades: the non-Bavarian 60. Reserve-Infanterie-Brigade (Reserve-Infanterie-Regiment Nr. 60, 99), 3. bayerische Reserve-Infanterie-Brigade (4. und 15. bayerisches Reserve-Infanterie-Regimenten) and 10. bayerische Reserve-Infanterie-Brigade, together with divisional cavalry, artillery and pioneer components. On August 17, 5. bayerische Ersatz-Brigade transferred into the division from the Bavarian Ersatz Division. By the end of August, 60. Reserve-Infanterie-Brigade had been broken up and its constituent regiments had left the division.

Order of Battle on August 18, 1914:

10. bayerische Reserve-Infanterie-Brigade
Kgl. Bayerisches 11. Reserve-Infanterie-Regiment
Kgl. Bayerisches 14. Reserve-Infanterie-Regiment
Festungs-MG-Kompanie Nr. 2
Reserve-MG-Abteilung Nr. 3
5. bayerische Ersatz-Brigade
Bayerisches Brigade-Ersatz-Bataillon Nr. 5 (mob.Ers.Btl./Kgl. Bay. 23.Inf.Regt.)
Bayerisches Brigade-Ersatz-Bataillon Nr. 6 (mob.Ers.Btl./Kgl. Bay. 18.Inf.Regt. Prinz Ludwig Ferdinand)
Bayerisches Brigade-Ersatz-Bataillon Nr. 7 (mob.Ers.Btl./Kgl. Bay. 5.Inf.Regt. Großherzog Ernst Ludwig von Hessen)
Bayerisches Brigade-Ersatz-Bataillon Nr. 8 (mob.Ers.Btl./Kgl. Bay. 8.Inf.Regt. Großherzog Friedrich II. von Baden)
Kavallerie-Ersatz-Abteilung Landau/II. Bayerisches Armeekorps ( Eskadron)
Kgl. Bayerisches 2. Feldartillerie-Regiment
1. Ersatz-Batterie/Kgl. Bayerisches 12. Feldartillerie-Regiment
Ersatz-Abteilung/Feldartillerie-Regiment Nr. 80
1.Ersatz-Batterie/Feldartillerie-Regiment Nr. 84
3.Batterie/Reserve-Feldartillerie-Regiment Nr. 14

Order of Battle on January 1, 1918:

5. Kgl. Bayerische Ersatz-Brigade
Kgl. Bayerisches 4. Ersatz-Regiment
Kgl. Bayerisches 8. Landwehr-Infanterie-Regiment
Kgl. Bayerisches 15. Landwehr-Infanterie-Regiment
2.Eskadron/Reserve-Husaren-Regiment Nr. 9
Kgl. Bayerischer Artillerie-Kommandeur 20:
Reserve-Feldartillerie-Regiment Nr. 239
Stab Kgl. Bayerisches 22. Pionier-Bataillon:
Kgl. Bayerische 13. Reserve-Pionier-Kompanie
Kgl. Bayerische 5. Landwehr-Pionier-Kompanie
Minenwerfer-Kompanie Nr. 230
Kgl. Bayerischer Divisions-Nachrichten-Kommandeur 430

References

 30. Bayerische Reserve-Division - Der erste Weltkrieg
 Hermann Cron et al., Ruhmeshalle unserer alten Armee (Berlin, 1935)
 Hermann Cron, Geschichte des deutschen Heeres im Weltkriege 1914-1918 (Berlin, 1937)

Infantry divisions of Germany in World War I
Military units and formations established in 1914
Military units and formations of Bavaria
1914 establishments in Germany
Military units and formations disestablished in 1918